Max Robert Litchfield (born 4 March 1995) is a British competitive swimmer who represented Great Britain in the 2016 Olympics, and the LEN European Aquatics Championships. He also swam for England in the 2014 Commonwealth Games. He competes internationally in freestyle and medley swimming events. Litchfield studies physiotherapy at Sheffield Hallam University. He currently represents Energy Standard in the International Swimming League. Litchfield is the son of former professional footballer, Peter Litchfield. His younger brother Joe Litchfield is also a swimmer.

Career

Clubs 
Litchfield began his swimming journey under the wing of coach Andrew Wallace, at Doncaster Dartes Swimming Club, before moving to train at City Of Sheffield's top junior squad, in 2013. This move saw him qualify for the Glasgow Commonwealth Games, shortly after, in the 400m Individual Medley. Max now trains at the British Swimming Loughborough National Centre (NC).

Achievements 
Litchfield swam at the 2014 Commonwealth Games in Glasgow where he finished 12th in both the 400m individual medley and the 1500m freestyle. He also turned out at the European Championships in Berlin in the same year where he finished fourth in the final of the 400m IM. He is a former World Junior Champion, having helped the 4 × 200 m freestyle team swim to gold in Dubai in 2013.

At the Olympic trials in 2016 he clinched victory in the 400m IM in a time of 4:12.05 to dip under the qualification time for Rio 2016. He later competed at the 2016 Summer Olympics in Rio de Janeiro achieving a 5th place in his heat. In the finals session he improved his personal best further to place 4th in his first Olympic final.

In 2018, he suffered an injury to the shoulder and withdrew from the Commonwealth Games. At the 2018 European Championships, Litchfield won a bronze in the 200 metre individual medley, his first major medal since the injury. He then won a silver in the 400 metre individual medley.

For the 400 metre freestyle at the 2022 South Africa National Swimming Championships, Litchfield placed second, only behind Matthew Sates of South Africa, to win the silver medal with a time of 3:51.37. On the second day, he won the silver medal in the 200 metre freestyle in a time of 1:49.49 and a gold medal in the 400 metre individual medley with a 2022 World Aquatics Championships qualifying time of 4:15.39. The following day, he won the silver medal in the 200 metre butterfly, finishing less than two seconds behind Chad le Clos of South Africa with a 1:57.66. The sixth and final day of competition, he won the silver medal in the 200 metre individual medley with a time of 1:59.96. His competing at the Championships was a culmination of a six-week stay in South Africa training with Chad le Clos in Cape Town. While he was pre-qualified for the World Championships, he was not named to the Great Britain roster for the year. He was initially named to the Team England roster for the 2022 Commonwealth Games, however was later replaced by Tony Robinson after withdrawing from the Games.

International Swimming League 
In the Autumn of 2019 he was member of the inaugural International Swimming League swimming for the Energy Standard International Swim Club, who won the team title in Las Vegas, Nevada, in December.

Awards
The 2016 British Universities & Colleges Sport (BUCS) Sportsman of the Year

References

External links
 
 

1995 births
Living people
English male swimmers
Olympic swimmers of Great Britain
Swimmers at the 2016 Summer Olympics
Sportspeople from Sheffield
Medalists at the FINA World Swimming Championships (25 m)
European Aquatics Championships medalists in swimming
Male medley swimmers
Swimmers at the 2020 Summer Olympics